Değirmentepe or Değirmentepe Hüyük is an archaeological site which is located at 50 km north of the river Euphrates and at 24 km in the northeast of Malatya province in eastern Anatolia. It is now submerged in the reservoir area of ​​the Karakaya and Atatürk dams.

Four archaeological layers whose dates are determined by techniques such as C14 and traces of fusion have been discovered in this mound:
 Middle Ages (late Roman-Byzantine period)
 Iron Age (1000 BC)
 Bronze Age ancient I (Karaz or Khirbet Kerak culture, end of 4th millennium-beginning of 3rd millennium BCE)
  Chalcolithic Age (Ubaid period, second half of Vth millennium BCE.)

The Chalcolithic Değirmepe level of Obaid-4 of the second half of the Vth millennium BCE, of which the sites of Tülintepe, Seyh Hüyük and Kurban Hüyük are contemporary, contain skeletons of adolescents with skull deformed. The remains of this cultural phase belonging to the Chalcolithic are relatively well preserved. However, serious damage caused by occasional flooding of the Euphrates, especially on architectural structures and the cemetery is to be deplored. Cranial deformities are not observed on human remains discovered and identified in Iron Age periods and medieval levels from Değrentepe.

The Chalcolithic period of this ancient village is characterized by rectangular mud brick houses that communicate with each other. We see the appearance of domestic animals such as dogs, sheeps, goats, pigs and Bovinae than at the beginning of the Chalcolithic. barley, wheat, oats, and peas were the most commonly cultivated plants. Many potterys characteristic of the Obaid culture have been found at the site. Archaeologists have discovered 450 sealings there which testify to the presence of notables capable of managing the productions .

References

See also 
 Prehistory of the Levant
 Prehistory of Mesopotamia

Prehistory of Asia
Anatolia
Archaeological sites in Turkey